Hainamuli 6 is a 2016 Bodo-language satirical film directed by Jagat Boro. The film is the most recent and the final part of the six Hainamuli film series. It stars Jwngsrang Brahma, Dwimasa Brahma and Jagat Boro. Lipika Brahma, Helina Daimary and Mwktang Basumatary play supporting roles in the film. The story of the film is jointly written by Jwngsrang Brahma and Dwimasa Brahma. It was released in August 2016. The film was produced by Tarzan Basumatary under the banner of Bangbula Film Production.

Plot summary
Two village friends, who are petty crooks find ways to live an unconventional life of crime in rural Bodo inhabited Assam. They've found ways to dupe over-enthusiastic Bodo villagers of their hard-earned money by presenting fraudulent entrepreneurial schemes or trapping naive young women to fulfill their carnal lust through deceit. Fwila, a prodigal son returns home after spending years away from it to discover that a pretty young cousin now lives in their house along with his aging parents. Smitten by her beauty, he makes a devious plan faking ownership of colossal wealth in the city where he had been all these years and lures her into an incestuous relationship that crosses all social boundaries. On the other hand, his friend, Mendela too gets into a relationship with another village belle, Monika who is from a culturally different ethnic group due to which he is unable to convince her brother to consent to their marriage. Apparently Monika's ethnic group evolved from the same ethnic ancestry as Mendela's. This is revealed later through the legacy data sought by her family to update the National Register of Citizens thereby paving a way for an agreement to marriage between the two.

Eventually, karma catches up with the two guys for all the dubious acts they've committed and they're unable to run away from the clutches of the law of the land. The two young women realize that their lives are shattered following the news of their arrest by the police. One of the young women is now pregnant from the illicit relationship and the other has to call off her wedding a few minutes before it was to be solemnized.

Cast
 Jwngsrang Brahma as Fwila
 Dwimasa Brahma as Mendela
 Jagat Boro Dabla

Music
The music is composed by Guru Pabitra Boro.
 "Dub Dub"- Rubeen Boro
 "Ransraonai Onnaini"- Gosai Daimary
 "Gwrbwjwng Onnai Hwnanwi"- Jonali Boro, Rubeen Boro

See also
 List of Bodo-language films

References

2016 films
Bodo-language films
Indian satirical films
2016 comedy films